Running Scared is a 1986 American action comedy film directed by Peter Hyams, written by Gary Devore and Jimmy Huston, and starring Gregory Hines, Billy Crystal, with Steven Bauer, Jimmy Smits and Dan Hedaya in supporting roles. Hines and Crystal play Chicago police officers who, after nearly being killed on the job, decide to retire and open a bar in Key West, Florida, only to get caught up in making one last arrest before they go.

The film was produced and released by Metro-Goldwyn-Mayer.

Plot
Ray Hughes and Danny Costanzo are two police officers working on Chicago's North Side, known for their wisecracking demeanors and unorthodox police methods, which get results in their various cases. One such case involves trying to bust up-and-coming drug dealer Julio Gonzales. After arresting Snake, one of Julio's associates, they convince him to wear a wire in order to get the necessary evidence to put Julio away. When they approach the meeting place (a cargo ship) they find that Gonzales has acquired a large store of Israeli Uzi submachine guns. Snake is setting the detectives up, however, prompting the detectives to rush in by acting as though Gonzales was preparing to kill him.  Gonzales reveals his ambition to be the next "godfather" of Chicago, but chastises Snake for letting the detectives get close, and Snake is shot dead by a subordinate.  The pair look as though they will be killed for sure, but two undercover detectives in Julio's gang step in to make the arrest. In the ensuing gun battle, most of Julio's gang escape, but Ray and Danny capture Gonzales.

Back at the station Ray and Danny expect to be praised, but instead their captain chastises them for their sloppy work (as revealed by Snake's wire) and orders them to take a vacation. On vacation in Key West, Florida, the pair begin to question their career choice after the experience and decide to retire and open a bar.

When they return to Chicago and inform the captain of their intentions, they find out that Gonzales has been released and is free on bail. Incensed, they vow to capture Gonzales before retiring, but by being a little more careful in the process. To add insult to injury, Captain Logan assigns them the additional task of training their replacements before they go. They must train detectives Anthony Montoya and Frank Sigliano, none other than the two undercover officers who saved them from being killed in the Gonzales bust.

During one of the attempts to capture Gonzales, Ray and Danny confiscate a large shipment of cocaine coming from Colombia. In order to get them back, Gonzales kidnaps Danny's ex-wife Anna, whom he still loves and has been trying to reconcile with, and says he will trade her for his drugs; otherwise, he will kill her. Danny agrees, leading to the final confrontation inside the high-rise atrium of the State of Illinois Center. During the ensuing fight, Danny and Ray rescue their would-be protégés in a way similar to their own rescuing, and Gonzales is killed. Anna and Danny reconcile and he and Ray decide not to retire after all.

Cast

Production
Hyams later recalled, after 2010 he wanted "to remain earthbound". He wanted to do "a comedy that was not stupid, and a film that had action in it, but a film where the action was not mean-spirited or bloody or graphic."

MGM came to him with a script about two elderly cops in New York who retire. He wanted to make it about two young cops in Chicago who did not retire. Hyams thought this "opened up a set of casting possibilities to me that were fresh" and "gave a chance visually to use a city that is not used as much".

"There were a lot of cop movies around at that time, so I decided that if I wanted to be interesting I needed to do it with two actors you would not normally expect to see in an action movie," said Hyams. "So I wanted Billy Crystal and Gregory Hines, and I got them and they were wonderful together. They just clicked.

Hines did an Amazing Stories with Hyams. "I just campaigned and campaigned for it until I got it," said Hines. And I'm proud because this is the first film that stars a black guy and a white guy - and the black guy has all the sex scenes. Of course, the part was to have been played by a white guy. But, still, those scenes are still in the movie. Usually, the black guy has no sexuality at all. "

The movie was filmed from September 1985 to January 1986. There were six weeks of filming in MGM's Studios plus location work in Key West and Chicago.

"Hyams was tough to work with," said Hines. "But I don't want to put the guy down."

Crystal said, "I contributed what I hope are little pearls throughout the piece. Peter Hyams... wanted me in the part because he felt I was the kind of writer/performer who could help the script at certain moments because I improvise a lot. So I got very involved. I would improvise during rehearsal and then sometimes I did it during a take, which gets even more dangerous. And you can't do those kinds of things unless you have an actor like Gregory Hines who is there to catch you. To hold you at that particular moment."

Reception
Running Scared was a moderate box office success, earning over $38 million. Reviews were mixed, however, and the film has a current 59% rating on Rotten Tomatoes, based on 22 reviews. The site's consensus states: "Running Scared struggles to strike a consistent balance between violent action and humor, but the chemistry between its well-matched leads keeps things entertaining." Film critic Roger Ebert recommended it, saying that the film "transcends its dreary roots and turns out to be a lot of fun".

Vincent Canby of The New York Times, however, advised people to "stay home and watch Miami Vice or Cagney and Lacey" instead.

Box office
The film debuted at #5 at the U.S. box office, with a weekend gross of $5,227,757.

Soundtrack

The Running Scared soundtrack was released in conjunction with the movie and contained a mix of songs and music featured in the film. The album sold well and produced three top 15 hits with performances by Klymaxx, Michael McDonald, New Edition, and Patti LaBelle. Producer Rod Temperton also contributed two songs with his band The Rod Temperton Beat Wagon.

Track listing

Singles chart positions

Album chart position

See also
 List of American films of 1986

References

External links
  at MGM.com
 
 
 
 
 [ Running Scared] at Allmusic

1986 films
1980s action comedy films
1980s buddy cop films
American action comedy films
American buddy cop films
1980s English-language films
Fictional portrayals of the Chicago Police Department
Films about Colombian drug cartels
Films directed by Peter Hyams
Films set in Chicago
Films shot in Chicago
Metro-Goldwyn-Mayer films
American police detective films
1986 comedy films
Films with screenplays by Gary DeVore
1980s American films